Milaor, officially the Municipality of Milaor, is a 3rd class municipality in the province of Camarines Sur, Philippines. According to the 2020 census, it has a population of 33,963 people.

Milaor is part of the Metro Naga Urban Area.

History

The work of evangelization in Milaor began in 1579 when the Franciscan missionaries came to the Philippines upon the order of Pope Sixtus V and King Philip II, and given specific assignment to work in Bicol Region.   In 1585, Milaor was declared a parish under the titular patron, Saint Joseph.   The first parish administrator was Fray Matias de Andrade, OFM., who arrived in Bikol in 1582 and later became the fifth Bishop of the Diocese of Nueva Caceres.

The Franciscans, Fray Juan del Sacramento and Fray Jose dela Virgen, initiated the construction of a church made of bricks and stones.   This was built in a place known today as "Sinimbahanan" now a part of Cabusao, where ruins of the concrete foundation may still be found.   Frequent attacks from the cimarrones and the tulisanes from nearby Mount Isarog, however, caused the transfer of the church to its present site.   Fray Santiago de San Pedro de Alcantara completed the construction in 1730 and added a convent made of wooden materials in 1735. Both the church and the convent were destroyed by fire in 1740 and immediately the reconstruction was undertaken by Fray Francisco delos Santos, OFM.   The present belfry was finished in 1840.

Milaor was formerly called "Milaud" or "may-laud".   "Laud" means a lowland prone to being flooded, in fact that is being true up to this day.   The expression "mapa-laud" means to go to a place which is low or with water, in other words, to go to a "laud".   From "Milaud" or "Maylaud" it was transferred to "Milaor".   The truth of this matter of the place being always filled with water is corroborated by the fact that in many barangays are to be found shells which thrive on water.   These shell fossils mean that in ancient time this place was really covered with water or is frequently flooded to allow these shells or mollusks to thrive in the place.

Originally, Milaor comprised Palestina and the present parishes of Minalabac, San Fernando and Gainza.   Until the eve following the uprising Naga City on September 19, 1898, during the Philippine Revolution, the Franciscan considered Milaor as their favorite resting place and abode away from the adjacent rapidly developing settlement that is Naga City today.

Geography

Barangays

Milaor is politically subdivided into 20 barangays. Just like most cities in the Philippines, Milaor has a barangay system which is the core Local Government of the Philippines. Each barangay is headed by a chairman and barangay councils who were elected into office by popular vote of the community registered voters every three years.

Climate

Demographics

Languages 

Central Bikol language is primarily being used in the town. Most people in Milaor speak the Coastal Bikol (Naga dialect) as their main language. While further south closer to Minalabac speaks a little of Rinconada Bikol which is recognized as a minority language. Tagalog is a secondary language in the town primarily used for tourists and visitors that cannot speak Bicolano language. Residents speak English as well when they go to work or school.

Religion

Parishes (Catholic Church in Milaor)

St. Joseph the Worker Parish 
St. Joseph the Worker is the titular patron saint of the Municipality. The town and parish fiesta is celebrated every 1st day of May. The present parish priest is Rev. Fr. Ruben R. Buena. The vision of the parish is to continue forming Basic Ecclesial Communities, locally called as SKK or Saradit na Kristiyanong Komunidad. The locus and focus of this dream of the Church is by clustering all the neighboring families.  Each cluster is composed of 15-20 families.

St. Anthony of Padua Parish 
On May 13, 1994, another parish within the municipality of Milaor was established. The seat is at barangay San Antonio and the titular patron saint is St. Anthony of Padua. At present the parish priest is Rev. Fr. Edgar L. Barias, SOLT.

Economy 

Formerly a sleepy suburb of Naga City Milaor became one of the most commercialized municipalities alongside Sipocot, Calabanga, Pili, Nabua and the nearby town of Canaman. This is due to its proximity to Naga City's CBD II and Almeda CBD. It's location along the National highway also makes it boom. Milaor hosts large Warehouse companies such as CitiHardware, Olivan Depot, Atlantic Bakery, Milaor Trading Corporation, Milaor Cement Corp and others. The municipality has a provincial cockpit arena and several financial institutions such as BDO Network Bank and M Lhuillier. 

Most people in the municipality are farmers and fishermen. However, since Milaor is close to Naga City (3 kilometers south), within the Manila-Naga road, and is the site of the upcoming Camarines Sur expressway, it has become a location of a great number of warehouses. Also because of its proximity to Naga City, it has become a population spillover, with many housing subdivisions being located, as well as entertainment centers. Camarines Sur Sports Arena is located in Brgy. Tarusanan.

Typical agricultural produce includes:
 Corn
 Palay (rice)
 Coconut 
 Wheat
 Mango

References

External links

 [ Philippine Standard Geographic Code]
Philippine Census Information

Municipalities of Camarines Sur
Metro Naga